Carditoidea is a superfamily of marine bivalve clams.

Families 
According to the World Register of Marine Species:

 Carditidae
 Condylocardiidae 
Cardiniidae

Notes:

 Previously in 2010, Condylocardiidae was classified in its own superfamily, Condylocardioidea.
 In the ITIS classification, Cardiniidae is instead classified in Astartoidea.

References

External links 

 
 
 

 
Bivalve superfamilies